Juan de Porras y Atienza (6 January 1627 – 28 July 1704) was a Roman Catholic prelate who served as Bishop of Coria (1684–1704) and Bishop of Ceuta (1681–1684).

Biography
Juan de Porras y Atienza was ordained a priest in 1653.
On 12 May 1681, he was appointed during the papacy of Pope Innocent XI as Bishop of Ceuta.
In 1681, he was consecrated bishop by Ambrosio Ignacio Spínola y Guzmán, Archbishop of Seville, with James Lynch, Archbishop of Tuam, and Bishop Antonio Ibarra, Bishop of Cádiz, serving as co-consecrators.
On 24 April 1684, he was appointed during the papacy of Pope Innocent XI as Bishop of Coria.
He served as Bishop of Coria until his death on 28 July 1704.
While bishop, he was the principal co-consecrator of Pedro de Lepe Orantes, Bishop of Calahorra y La Calzada (1686).

References

External links and additional sources
 (for Chronology of Bishops) 
 (for Chronology of Bishops) 

17th-century Roman Catholic bishops in Africa
18th-century Roman Catholic bishops in Spain
Bishops appointed by Pope Innocent XI
1627 births
1704 deaths
Bishops of Ceuta